Dawera-Daweloor is an Austronesian language spoken in six villages on Dawera and Daweloor islands in South Maluku, Indonesia.

Phonology

Consonants 
Dawera-Daweloor has the following consonants.

Vowels 
Dawera-Daweloor has the following vowels.

Notes

References 
 Svetlana Chlenova.  2002.  "Daweloor, A Southwest Moluccan Language," Malaisko-indoneziiskie Issledovanlija 15:145-175.

Babar languages
Languages of the Maluku Islands